Caryocolum immixtum is a moth of the family Gelechiidae. It is found in Afghanistan.

The length of the forewings is about 5 mm for males and about 4.5 mm for females. The forewings are dark brown, scattered with white. There are some indistinct white markings. Adults have been recorded on wing from late May to late June.

References

Moths described in 1988
immixtum
Moths of Asia